"Little Willy" is a song written by songwriters Nicky Chinn and Mike Chapman and performed by the British glam rock band The Sweet, released in 1972 as a non-album single in the UK, peaking at #4 in the best seller charts. It was released in the US in September 1972 and also appeared on their US debut album The Sweet and became their biggest hit in the US, reaching #3 on the Billboard Hot 100. Billboard ranked it as the #18 song for 1973.

In a retrospective review of glitter rock, Bomp! noted that although rock music journalists almost uniformly "loathed it", the song was a huge commercial success and "helped launch the essential glitter rock formula sound".

"Little Willy" was used extensively in the pilot of the television series Life on Mars.

Chart performance

Weekly charts

Year-end charts

Personnel

"Little Willy" 
Brian Connolly – lead vocals
Andy Scott – backing vocals
Steve Priest – backing vocals
Mick Tucker – backing vocals
Pip Williams – guitar
John Roberts – bass guitar
Phil Wainman – drums, timbales

"Man from Mecca" 
Brian Connolly – lead vocals
Andy Scott – backing vocals, guitar
Steve Priest – backing vocals, bass guitar
Mick Tucker – backing vocals, drums

Parody versions 
Bob Rivers recorded a parody called "Little Billy's Willy", about President Bill Clinton and the Lewinsky scandal.

References

External links
 

The Sweet songs
1972 songs
1972 singles
Bubblegum pop songs
RPM Top Singles number-one singles
Number-one singles in Germany
Number-one singles in Denmark
Songs written by Mike Chapman
Songs written by Nicky Chinn
Song recordings produced by Phil Wainman
RCA Records singles
Poison (American band) songs
British power pop songs